Barnoldswick (pronounced  ) is a market town and civil parish in the Borough of Pendle, Lancashire, England. It is within the boundaries of the historic West Riding of Yorkshire, Barnoldswick and the surrounding areas of West Craven have been administered since 1974 as part of Lancashire. This was when West Riding County Council and Barnoldswick Urban District Council were abolished and the town was transferred to the Borough of Pendle.

It lies near the Yorkshire Dales National Park and the Forest of Bowland Area of Outstanding Natural Beauty. Stock Beck, a tributary of the River Ribble, runs through the town, which has a population of 10,752.

On the lower slopes of Weets Hill in the Pennines, astride the natural watershed between the Ribble and Aire valleys, Barnoldswick is the highest town on the Leeds and Liverpool Canal, lying on the summit level of the canal between Barrowford Locks to the south west and Greenberfield Locks just north east of the town,  from Leeds, Manchester and Preston.

Nearby towns include Skipton to the east, Clitheroe to the west, Burnley to the south, and Keighley to the east southeast.

History
Barnoldswick dates back to Anglo Saxon times. It was listed in the Domesday Book as Bernulfesuuic, meaning "Bernulf's Town" ( being an archaic spelling of –wick, meaning "settlement", in particular, a "dairy farm"). The town is known locally as Barlick.

A Cistercian monastery was founded there in 1147, by monks from Fountains Abbey. However, they left after six years, before construction was complete, driven out by crop failures and locals unhappy at their interference in the affairs of the local church. They went on to build Kirkstall Abbey. They returned after another ten years to build the isolated Church of St Mary-le-Ghyll close to the road between Barnoldswick and Thornton in Craven.

For hundreds of years, Barnoldswick remained a small village. However, the arrival of the Leeds and Liverpool Canal, and later the (now closed) railway, spurred the development of the existing woollen industry, and helped it to become a major cotton town. The engine of the last mill to be built in Barnoldswick, Bancroft Mill, has been preserved and is now open as a tourist attraction – a 600hp steam engine, which is still operational.

Governance

Barnoldswick was an ancient parish in Staincliffe Wapentake in the West Riding of Yorkshire (although Blackburnshire in Lancashire sometimes claimed the area). The parish included the townships of Brogden with Admergill, Coates and Salterforth, all of which became separate civil parishes in 1866. The civil parish of Coates rejoined the parish of Barnoldswick in 1923.

From 1894 until 1974, Barnoldswick formed an urban district within the administrative county of the West Riding of Yorkshire. Until 1974, post used to be addressed via Colne, Lancashire, to addresses in Barnoldswick.

Following the Local Government Act 1972, Barnoldswick and a number of surrounding Yorkshire villages, including Earby and Kelbrook, were transferred to the Borough of Pendle in the Non-metropolitan county of Lancashire in 1974.

At present, Barnoldswick has a town council, and forms part of the West Craven Area Committee on Pendle Borough Council.

In 2014, Eliza Mowe celebrated 10 years as one of only 20 female town criers in the country.

Local media
Barnoldswick receives television from Leeds; ITV (Yorkshire Television) and BBC Yorkshire are both transmitted from the television mast at East Marton, three miles north east of Barnoldswick. Television transmissions from the North West region BBC North West and ITV (Granada Television) are blocked by Weets Hill. Despite this, Granada Reports still covers news from Barnoldswick. Up until 2011, analogue signals of Channel 4 could be received, but Five was extremely limited.

Radio reception is also restricted in the town. There is a local low power FM relay station, transmitting the four main BBC national radio stations (Radio 1 to 4), but no local stations. Fresh Radio in Skipton covered the area on AM – 1413 kHz before being taken over by Stray FM, part of the UKRD Group, which also owns 2BR, the adjacent station based near Accrington

The town now receives digital terrestrial signals and cable services as well as via Sky or Freesat. The local press is published weekly; the Craven Herald & Pioneer and Barnoldswick and Earby Times are published on Fridays, the daily Lancashire Telegraph newspaper covers Barnoldswick in its Burnley, Pendle and Rossendale edition and the Yorkshire Post is also prominent.

Local industry 
Since 1854, Barnoldswick has been the home of Esse stoves, one of the country's oldest standing stove manufacturers. The company have manufactured in the town since 1854 and clients have included Florence Nightingale, Shackleton and Scott, Alan Hinkes and River Cottage. Esse have their head office at the Ouzledale Factory in the town and distribute all their stoves through a close link of specialist stove retailers.

Barnoldswick is also home to Silentnight Beds, the United Kingdom's largest manufacturer of beds and mattresses. Silentnight, part of the Silentnight Group, has its head office and manufacturing premises in the town. Silentnight is noteworthy in trade union history (in this case Furniture, Timber and Allied Trades Union) as having the longest ever strike, from 1985 to 1987.

Rolls-Royce plc is a large employer based in the town. It was originally Bankfield Shed, a cotton weaving mill that Rover used to produce the production version of Whittle's gas turbine and was purchased by Rolls-Royce in 1943. The model number of many Rolls-Royce jet engines start with the initials RB (e.g. RB199) which stands for Rolls Barnoldswick, as Rolls-Royce aero's design centre was situated in Barnoldswick.

Hope Technology, a manufacturer of mountain bike parts such as disc brakes, hubs, and headsets, is based in Barnoldswick. Albert Hartley Textiles is the last remaining textiles mill in the town and is a big employer for the local area. Originally, there were thirteen mills in the town, the last being constructed in 1920. There are currently plans to renovate the mill and create a local apprenticeship scheme.

Put in place by Manchester-based property developers, Capital & Centric Plc the scheme would involve construction of a new factory, and a medium-sized supermarket. The plans were approved over two other competing schemes in August 2012, the council citing that, in addition to adhering with planning policy, the site on Harley was favoured, because of the job creation for the town.

Education 
Barnoldswick is served by four primary schools; Gisburn Road, Church School and Coates Lane, whilst St. Joseph's caters to the town's Catholic population. Most secondary age students attend West Craven High School, a Technology specialist school situated in Barnoldswick itself, though a significant minority of students attend Ss John Fisher and Thomas More Roman Catholic High School and Park High School in Colne, and the Skipton Grammar Schools, Ermysted's and Skipton Girls' High School.

Transport 

Barnoldswick was formerly served by a station on the Midland Railway's branch line off the Skipton to Colne Line, though this was closed under the Beeching Axe in 1965. The pressure group Selrap is currently campaigning for the reopening of the Skipton to Colne line. Which forms part of the modern day East Lancashire Line from Burnley to Nelson and Colne.

At present, would be rail passengers must travel via Colne or Clitheroe for trains serving Lancashire, or via Skipton for trains serving North and West Yorkshire.

Public transport to the town is therefore restricted to buses. Barnoldswick lies on the bus routes between Skipton and Burnley and between Skipton and Clitheroe/Preston, operated by Burnley Bus Company and Stagecoach respectively. On Sundays there is a service from Burnley to Grassington in the Yorkshire Dales National Park that passes through Barnoldswick.

The nearest airports are Manchester (about 1¼ hours by car or about three hours by public transport) and Leeds Bradford (40 minutes by car or about two hours by public transport).

Sport
The town's main football club, Barnoldswick Town, plays in the North West Counties League.

Notable residents
 The footballer Michael Holt was born in Barnoldswick
  Burnley and Scotland goalkeeper Adam Blacklaw lived in Barnoldswick, and also ran local pub The Cross Keys
 Gordon Prentice, Pendle Labour MP (1992–2010)
 The majority of the Siddiq dynasty reside in Barnoldswick

In popular culture
The film A Private Function, released in 1984, was partly filmed in Barnoldswick.

See also
Listed buildings in Barnoldswick

References

External links 

Visit Barnoldswick website

 
Towns and villages in the Borough of Pendle
Towns in Lancashire
Civil parishes in Lancashire